A robotic android, also known simply as a robot android, robotic droid, robot droid, robotoid, robodroid or roboid, is an artificial lifeform that is created through processes that are totally different from cloning or synthetics. In short, it is the cybernetic equivalent of an android.

Perhaps the first mention of "robotoid" was in the Lost in Space episode War of the Robots which originally aired on February 9, 1966 and credits Robby the Robot as a robotoid and William Bramley and Ollie O'Toole as uncredited "robotoid voice" actors. In the episode, the Lost in Space robot says: "It is more than a machine...it is a robotoid." The robot goes on to explain that as a robot, it is constrained by its programming, whereas the robotoid has the capability of making a choice. The episode is described as: "The family's robot is seemingly replaced when Will repairs a robotoid from an advanced civilization - until the new machine wreaks havoc by trying to take over the ship."

Piers Anthony's short story Getting Through University, which may have been published as early as 1967/1968 in the science fiction magazine Worlds of If, mentions a robotoid.

In April 1968, Marvel Comics released Avengers #51 which introduced the Robotoid.

On December 20, 1978, the Battle of the Planets TV series episode Rage of the Robotoids was released.

See also
Mind uploading
Rage of the Robotoids: Battle of the Planets anime episode
Lost in Space
Reptoid

References

External links
NESARA: History and Purpose of CLONES and CLONING - PART 2: The SCIENTISTS REPORT: THE CLONING OF MAN, OR I WONDER WHO’S KISSINGER NOW?, Calvin Burgin, February 12, 1997, Phoenix Journal #197, chapter 14

Science and technology-related conspiracy theories
Robotics concepts
Dystopian literature